Bashkargol Lake (- "Lake of Green Valley") is a lake located in the upper Chitral Valley at a distance of about  from Chitral town in Chitral District of Khyber Pakhtunkhwa province of Pakistan. The lake is accessible by a four-wheel drive vehicle to the village of Sor Laspur followed by a kilometer's hike, and is often utilized for camping on the way to base camp of the peak Thalo Zom or to cross Thalo Pass.

Geography
The Bashkargol lake is fed by melting glaciers and springs of the Hindu Kush mountain  including the glaciers from Thalo Zom, Gochhar Sar and Kharakhali Peaks. The outlet from the lake gives rise to Laspur River, the major left tributary of the Chitral River which meets the Yarkhun River at the town of Mastuj to form the Mastuj River.

Flora and fauna
During the winter, the Bashkargol lake freezes and is covered by heavy snow. In the summers, the basin of the lake is surrounded by a sheet of alpine flowers like rose hip and gentian. Apart from it, the lake is encircled by diverse pinus species which serves as an abode for wild birds. Unlike other alpine lakes, Bashkargol Lake houses only a handful of fish.

Camping and Recreation
Although a much lesser-known lake, in recent year it has gained popularity as a camping spot for the locals of Laspur Valley as well as hikers who traverse from Chitral valley to Kumrat Valley in Upper Dir via Thalo Pass. It is also a stopover for mountaineers approaching the base camp of Thalo Zom peak.

Gallery

See also
Karambar Lake - Broghil Valley
Handarap Lake - Ghizer Valley
Saidgai Lake - Swat Valley
Kundol Lake - Kalam Valley
Daral Lake - Swat Valley

References

Lakes of Khyber Pakhtunkhwa
Swat District
Swat Kohistan
Tourist attractions in Swat
Tourism in Khyber Pakhtunkhwa